The National Council of American–Soviet Friendship (NCASF) was the successor organisation to the National Council on Soviet Relations (NCSR).

History

Foundation 

The 1930s witnessed the birth of the American–Soviet friendship movement which revolved around the Friends of the Soviet Union, founded in 1929. One of the major goals of the movement was for the United States and the Soviet Union to form an anti-fascist alliance. This eventually led to the foundation of the NCSR, which became the NCASF in 1941. The Council's membership was largely made up of professionals sympathetic to socialism and communism.

Structure 

The council was formed of several different branches and offices.

Members

Corliss Lamont was one of the founders and the first chairman of the council. Professor Ralph Barton Perry of Harvard University was vice-chairman of the council. Edwin Smith was the executive director of the council.

Activities 

In April 1944 at the founding of the council, Charlie Chaplin was one of the sponsors.  On 16 November 1944, when an "American – Soviet Friendship Rally" was held in Madison Square Garden, a number of Hollywood movie stars — including Chaplin, John Garfield, Rita Hayworth, Orson Welles, James Cagney, Katharine Hepburn, Gene Kelly, and Edward G. Robinson — signed a message in a gesture of support. The statement said that the artists added their voices in favor of the bond that existed between "our great country and our great Allies." The message added: "In this friendship lies not only the hope but the future of the world."

In 1946 the House Un-American Activities Committee initiated a formal inquiry into the NCASF. In 1947, charges were brought against the Council for failing to register with the Subversive Activities Control Board.

In May 1948, the New York Times that the new movie  The Iron Curtain "has been under attack since January by various groups including the National Council of American-Soviet Friendship."

Composer Aaron Copland was later questioned by Senator McCarthy regarding his membership on the Music Committee.

Closure

In 1991, the council ceased operations.

Successors ICFSSP and USFSP
NCASF's successor organization, based in Canada, is called the International Council for Friendship and Solidarity with Soviet People (ICFSSP). The magazine of the International Council is called Northstar Compass. The affiliate to the International Council in the United States is the U.S. Friends of the Soviet People (USFSP). The current officers of USFSP are Dr. Angelo D'Angelo (Chair), George Gruenthal (Vice Chair), Fiona Fairchild (Secretary), and Joseph F. Hancock (Bulletin Editor).

Legacy

The moving image collection of the National Council of American–Soviet Friendship is held at the Academy Film Archive. The collection consists of over 1,000 16mm prints, representing about 700 titles.

Publications

During its years of operation the NCASF released numerous publications focusing upon daily life in the Soviet Union and information regarding the state of American–Soviet relations.

References 

Soviet Union friendship associations
Soviet Union–United States relations
Communism in the United States
Communist Party USA mass organizations
United States friendship associations